Leandro da Fonseca Euzébio (born August 18, 1981 in Cabo Frio), is a Brazilian central defender. After a very good season in 2006 playing for Náutico where he won the promotion for the first division he moved to Japan. He currently plays for Náutico.

Club statistics

Honours
Cruzeiro
Minas Gerais State League: 2006

Fluminense
Brazilian Série A: 2010, 2012
Campeonato Carioca: 2012

External links

 CBF
 LEANDRO, ALVIRRUBRO DO OUTRO LADO DO MUNDO
 Diretoria anuncia zagueiro Leandro
 wldcup.com

1981 births
Living people
Brazilian footballers
Brazilian expatriate footballers
Expatriate footballers in Japan
Expatriate footballers in Qatar
Campeonato Brasileiro Série A players
Campeonato Brasileiro Série B players
Campeonato Brasileiro Série C players
J1 League players
Qatar Stars League players
People from Cabo Frio
Association football defenders
Fluminense FC players
Bonsucesso Futebol Clube players
América Futebol Clube (MG) players
Associação Desportiva Cabofriense players
Cruzeiro Esporte Clube players
Clube Náutico Capibaribe players
Omiya Ardija players
Goiás Esporte Clube players
Al-Khor SC players
Tupi Football Club players
Anápolis Futebol Clube players
Club Sportivo Sergipe players
Sportspeople from Rio de Janeiro (state)